Jerzy Hewelt (born 23 August 1948 in Trzebież Szczeciński) is a Polish former hurdler who competed in the 1976 Summer Olympics.

References

1948 births
Living people
Polish male hurdlers
Olympic athletes of Poland
Athletes (track and field) at the 1976 Summer Olympics
People from Police County
Sportspeople from West Pomeranian Voivodeship
Universiade medalists in athletics (track and field)
Universiade gold medalists for Poland
Medalists at the 1975 Summer Universiade
20th-century Polish people